The Catalonia International Prize is a Spanish international prize, awarded every year since 1989 by the Generalitat de Catalunya. The award recognizes the work of people who have not only contributed to the development of culture, science or economics, but have also stood out for having completed their work with a high ethical and humanistic commitment.

Institutions and organizations from all over the world present candidates every year, usually exceeding 200 people. A large jury, composed of various personalities from different fields, and independent of the Generalitat, determine one award winner each year. The prize is only given to living people, and cannot be awarded posthumously. Four times (1995, 2004, 2008, and 2013) the award has been shared by two people.

The prize is presented at the beginning of March by the President of the Government of Catalonia and consists of a cash prize (in 2005 it was 80,000 euros) and a work of art.

History 
{| style="background:#ffffff" class="sortable wikitable" 
|+ 
|-
! style="background:#efefef;"| Year !! style="background:#efefef;" width=180 px| Winner !! style="background:#efefef;"| Nacionality !! style="background:#efefef;" width=200 px| Activity 
|-
|-
| 1989 || Karl Popper || United Kingdom  || philosopher
|-
| 1990 || Abdus Salam || Pakistan || physicist
|-
| 1991 || Jacques Cousteau || France || oceanographer
|-
| 1992 || Mstislav Rostropóvich || Russia || Cellist
|-
| 1993 || Luigi Luca Cavalli-Sforza || Italy || geneticist
|-
| 1994 || Edgar Morin || France || sociologist
|-
| 1995 || Václav HavelRichard von Weizsäcker || Czech Republic Germany || writer essayist and politician  politician
|-
| 1996 || Yaşar Kemal || Turkey  || novelist
|-
| 1997 || Amartya Sen || India || economist
|-
| 1998 || Jacques Delors || France  || politician
|-
| 1999 || Doris Lessing || United Kingdom || writer
|-
| 2000 || Abdallah Laroui || Morocco  || historian
|-
| 2001 || Andrea Riccardi || Italy || historian
|-
| 2002 || Harold Bloom || United States || Essayist
|-
| 2003 || Nawal al-Sa'dawi || Egypt|| writer and social activist
|-
| 2004 || Sari NusseibehAmos Oz || Palestine Israel || philosopher and writer
|-
| 2005 || Claude Lévi-Strauss || France || anthropologist
|-
| 2006 || Pere Casaldáliga || Spain  || religion
|-
| 2007 || Edward Osborne Wilson || United States|| entomologist, biologist and science communicator
|-
| 2008 || Cynthia MaungAung San Suu Kyi || MyanmarMyanmar || medicActivist
|-
| 2009 || Bill Viola || United States|| Video artist
|-
| 2010 || Jimmy Carter|| United States || politician
|-
| 2011 || Haruki Murakami|| Japan || writer
|-
| 2012 || Luiz Inácio Lula da Silva|| Brazil || Metallurgist, trade unionist and politician
|-
| 2013||Malala YousafzaiGro Harlem Brundtland||PakistanNorway||Student, activistpolitician
|- 
| 2014||Desmond Tutu|| South Africa||activist
|-
| 2015||Jane Goodall||United Kingdom||primatologist
|-
| 2016||Josep BaselgaManel EstellerJoan Massagué||Spain||oncologist
|- 
| 2019||Vinton Cerf||United States||computer scientist
|-
| 2020||Ngũgĩ wa Thiong'o||Kenya||writer and activist 
|}

Catalan awards